Jack E. Heron (July 28, 1926 – January 10, 2012) was an American basketball coach.  He is the winningest coach in Sacramento State University history.

Heron, from Worland, Wyoming, played collegiately for Whitman College and Sacramento State.  After coaching at the high school level in Shoshoni, Wyoming, and Sacramento, Heron joined Everett Shelton staff at Sacramento State.

Following Shelton's retirement in 1968, Heron was named head coach, where he remained until 1984 (with the exception of the 1978–79 season, which he missed due to illness).  Heron amassed a record of 196–258 (.432), making him the school's all-time leader in wins.

Heron died on January 10, 2012, in his home in Dubois, Wyoming.

References

1926 births
2012 deaths
Basketball players from Wyoming
High school basketball coaches in the United States
People from Worland, Wyoming
Sacramento State Hornets baseball players
Sacramento State Hornets men's basketball coaches
Sacramento State Hornets men's basketball players
Whitman Blues men's basketball players
People from Dubois, Wyoming
American men's basketball players
Basketball coaches from Wyoming
Guards (basketball)